Laʻakapu was an ancient Hawaiian noble lady and a High Chiefess of the Big Island (Hawaiʻi) as a wife of Kahoukapu, Aliʻi Nui of Hawaiʻi. She was the mother of the High Chief Kauholanuimahu, who succeeded his father.

Biography
Lady Laʻakapu was born in ancient Hawaiʻi as a daughter of Huanuikeʻekeʻehilani and Keomahuʻilani (Ke-ō-mahuʻi-lani). Laʻakapu had two siblings. According to the famous historian Samuel Kamakau, Laʻakapu was a descendant of the nobleman Kila.

Chiefess of Hawaiʻi 
Laʻakapu married High Chief Kahoukapu of Hawaiʻi, who was the grandson of the famous Chief Kalaunuiohua. The son of Laʻakapu and Kahoukapu was the High Chief Kauholanuimahu, who became a ruler of his island after his father's death. Through him, Laʻakapu was an ancestress of many nobles and chiefs.

There is a famous legend about Laʻakapu and the birth of Kauholanuimahu. According to this old legend, she was unable to produce a child, so she asked the priest for the solution, and he told her that she need to catch a certain species of fish. Laʻakapu could not please the priest two times, and when she lost her patience, priest finally told her which kind of fish he wants. Priest performed a ritual, and he sacrificed the fish. This time, after Laʻakapu slept with Kahoukapu, she bore a son.

Other marriages 
Other consorts of Laʻakapu were Kanalukapu and Lanakukahahauula. Children of Laʻakapu by Kanalukapu:
Hilo (son)
Kapulaʻa (daughter) 
Lanakukahahauula and Laʻakapu had a daughter, Lulanalomakukahahauula, who had three children.

It is not known when did Laʻakapu die.

Sources

House of Pili
Hawaiian chiefesses